The Shire of Baw Baw is a local government area in Victoria, Australia, in the eastern part of the state.

It includes the towns of Drouin, Longwarry, Neerim South, Trafalgar, Warragul and Yarragon. It was formed in 1994 from the amalgamation of the Shire of Buln Buln, Shire of Narracan, Rural City of Warragul, and some parts of the Shire of Upper Yarra.

The shire is governed and administered by the Baw Baw Shire Council; its seat of local government and administrative centre is located at the council headquarters in Drouin, and it has a service centre located in Warragul. The shire is named after the major geographical feature in the region, the Baw Baw Plateau with Mount Baw Baw being the second highest peak in the region. An unincorporated area, the Mount Baw Baw Alpine Resort, is enclaved within the shire.

Location and geography
The more densely populated southern half of the shire consists of low rolling hills given over primarily to dairy farming and other agriculture. The northern half lies in the Great Dividing Range and its foothills, where forestry remains an important industry. Tourism is also important in the region, aided by its proximity to and easy access from Melbourne. The shire is known for its rural scenery and natural environment, as well as gourmet foods and wines. The historic gold-mining town of Walhalla is located in the northeast of the shire is a major tourist drawcard. The major electricity-producing region of the Latrobe Valley lies immediately to the shire's east and south.

Many of the shire's larger towns are located along the Princes Highway and main Gippsland Railway line, which cross the southern part of the shire. From west to east these include: Longwarry, Drouin, Warragul, Darnum, Yarragon, and Trafalgar. North of Warragul are Buln Buln, Neerim South, and Noojee, while south of Trafalgar in the Strzelecki Ranges lies the town of Thorpdale. The towns of Rawson, Erica, and Parkers Corner are located near Walhalla amongst the foothills of the Baw Baw Plateau. Aberfeldy is located in the far north east of the shire above the Thomson Dam, which supplies 50% of Melbourne's water.

Council

Composition up to November 2016
The council was composed of four wards and nine councillors, with three councillors elected to represent the Warragul Ward and two councillors per remaining ward elected to represent each of the other wards.

Composition November 2016 to November 2020
The council was changed to a three-ward structure with three councillors per ward, with the new council sworn in on 2 November 2016. The new wards are West [660sq kms] (primarily Drouin with some rural areas north/south), Central [66sq kms] (Warragul town) and East [3,302sq kms] making up the balance of the shire.

Current composition
The council's three-ward structure continued with three councillors per ward, with the new council sworn in on 18 November 2020. The wards are West [660sq kms] (primarily Drouin with some rural areas north/south), Central [66sq kms] (based on Warragul) and East [3,302sq kms] making up the balance of the shire.

Administration and governance
The council meets fortnightly in the Fountain Room of the West Gippsland Arts Centre. The council's administrative activities are centred in Drouin in the former offices of the Buln Buln Shire. It also provides customer services at both Warragul and the council offices in Drouin. Service centres in Trafalgar and on Smith Street in Warragul were closed in 2015.

Townships and localities
The 2021 census, the shire had a population of 57,626 up from 48,479 in the 2016 census

^ - Territory divided with another LGA
* - Not noted in 2016 Census
# - Not noted in 2021 Census

See also
 List of localities (Victoria)
 List of reduplicated Australian place names
 Local government in Australia

References

External links

Baw Baw Shire Council official website
Visit Baw Baw official website
Metlink local public transport map
Link to Land Victoria interactive maps

Local government areas of Victoria (Australia)
Gippsland (region)